Peter Campion (born 1976) is an American poet.
 
He graduated from Dartmouth College with a BA, and from Boston University with an MA. He taught at Washington College, Ashland University, and Auburn University. He currently teaches at University of Minnesota and heads the Department of Creative Writing there.

His work has appeared in AGNI, ArtNews, The Boston Globe, Modern Painters, The New York Times, The New Republic, Poetry, Slate, and The Yale Review. 
He won a Levis Reading Prize, for The Lions.

He was a Stegner Fellow and Jones Lecturer at Stanford University, a Theodore Morrison Fellow at the Bread Loaf Writers' Conference, and a Guggenheim Fellow. 
He won a Pushcart Prize, and Joseph Brodsky Rome Prize from the American Academy of Arts and Letters,

For five years, he edited the journal Literary Imagination, published by Oxford University Press, before turning over the editorship to Saskia Hamilton and Archie Burnett. 
He currently edits the literary journal Great River Review, published by the University of Minnesota Creative Writing Program.

Works

References

External links
 http://www.petercampion.net
 http://www.poetryfoundation.org/bio/peter-campion

1976 births
American male poets
Dartmouth College alumni
Boston University alumni
Washington College faculty
Ashland University faculty
Auburn University faculty
University of Minnesota faculty
Living people
Place of birth missing (living people)
21st-century American poets
21st-century American male writers